The 4th Blockbuster Entertainment Awards were held on March 10, 1998 at the Pantages Theater in Los Angeles. Below is a complete list of nominees and winners. Winners are highlighted in bold.

Film

Favorite Actor – Action/Adventure
 Nicolas Cage, Face/Off & Con Air
 Harrison Ford, Air Force One
 John Travolta, Face/Off

Favorite Actress – Action/Adventure
 Linda Hamilton, Dante's Peak
 Nicole Kidman, The Peacemaker
 Jennifer Lopez, Anaconda

Favorite Actor – Comedy
 Jim Carrey, Liar Liar
 Kevin Kline, In & Out
 Mike Myers, Austin Powers

Favorite Actress – Comedy
 Julia Roberts, My Best Friend's Wedding
 Joan Cusack, In & Out
 Elizabeth Hurley, Austin Powers

Favorite Actor – Drama
 Leonardo DiCaprio, Titanic
 Matt Damon, John Grisham's The Rainmaker
 Matthew McConaughey, Contact

Favorite Actress – Drama
 Kate Winslet, Titanic
 Jodie Foster, Contact
 Madonna, Evita

Favorite Actor – Horror
 David Arquette, Scream 2
 Freddie Prinze, Jr., I Know What You Did Last Summer
 Tom Sizemore, The Relic

Favorite Actress – Horror
 Neve Campbell, Scream 2
 Courteney Cox, Scream 2
 Jennifer Love Hewitt, I Know What You Did Last Summer

Favorite Actor – Science Fiction
 Will Smith, Men in Black
 Jeff Goldblum, The Lost World: Jurassic Park
 Tommy Lee Jones, Men in Black

Favorite Actress – Science Fiction
 Uma Thurman, Batman & Robin
 Julianne Moore, The Lost World: Jurassic Park
 Sigourney Weaver, Alien Resurrection

Favorite Actor – Suspense
 Mel Gibson, Conspiracy Theory
 Morgan Freeman, Kiss the Girls
 Bruce Willis, The Jackal

Favorite Actress – Suspense
 Julia Roberts, Conspiracy Theory
 Ashley Judd, Kiss the Girls
 Elisabeth Shue, The Saint

Favorite Actor – Newcomer
 Howard Stern, Private Parts
 Casper Van Dien, Starship Troopers
 Michael Jai White, Spawn

Favorite Actress – Newcomer
 Jennifer Love Hewitt, I Know What You Did Last Summer
 Milla Jovovich, The Fifth Element
 Denise Richards, Starship Troopers

Family Animated Favorite
 Anastasia
 Cats Don't Dance
 Hercules

Family Favorite
 Tim Allen, Jungle 2 Jungle
 Brendan Fraser, George of the Jungle
 Robin Williams, Flubber

Favorite Supporting Actor – Action/Adventure
 John Cusack, Con Air
 Alessandro Nivola, Face/Off
 Gary Oldman, Air Force One

Favorite Supporting Actress – Action/Adventure
 Glenn Close, Air Force One
 Joan Allen, Face/Off
 Rachel Ticotin, Con Air

Favorite Supporting Actor – Comedy
 Rupert Everett, My Best Friend's Wedding
 Justin Cooper, Liar Liar
 Tom Selleck, In & Out

Favorite Supporting Actress – Comedy
 Cameron Diaz, My Best Friend's Wedding
 Debbie Reynolds, In & Out
 Jennifer Tilly, Liar Liar

Favorite Supporting Actor – Drama
 Billy Zane, Titanic
 Danny DeVito, John Grisham's The Rainmaker
 Tom Skerritt, Contact

Favorite Supporting Actress – Drama
 Kathy Bates, Titanic
 Claire Danes, John Grisham's The Rainmaker
 Charlize Theron, The Devil's Advocate

Favorite Supporting Actor – Horror
 Jamie Kennedy, Scream 2
 John Leguizamo, Spawn
 Ryan Phillippe, I Know What You Did Last Summer

Favorite Supporting Actress – Horror
 Sarah Michelle Gellar, I Know What You Did Last Summer
 Jada Pinkett, Scream 2
 Theresa Randle, Spawn

Favorite Supporting Actor – Science Fiction
 Chris O'Donnell, Batman & Robin
 Vincent D'Onofrio, Men in Black
 Arnold Schwarzenegger, Batman & Robin

Favorite Supporting Actress – Science Fiction
 Winona Ryder, Alien Resurrection
 Linda Fiorentino, Men in Black
 Alicia Silverstone, Batman & Robin

Favorite Supporting Actor – Suspense
 Patrick Stewart, Conspiracy Theory
 Cary Elwes, Kiss the Girls
 Sidney Poitier, The Jackal

Favorite Supporting Actress – Suspense
 Kathleen Quinlan, Breakdown
 Judy Davis, Absolute Power
 Diane Venora, The Jackal

Filmmaker Award
 Robert Duvall

World Artist Award
 Arnold Schwarzenegger

Music

Favorite CD
 Jewel, Pieces of You
 Spice Girls, Spice
 The Wallflowers, Bringing Down the Horse

Favorite Duo/Group – Country
 Brooks & Dunn, Greatest Hits Collection
 Alabama, Dancin' on the Boulevard
 Sawyer Brown, Six Days on the Road

Favorite Female – Country
 LeAnn Rimes, Unchained Melody: The Early Years
 Shania Twain, Come On Over
 Trisha Yearwood, (Songbook) A Collection of Hits

Favorite Male – Country
 Garth Brooks, Sevens
 Tim McGraw, Everywhere
 George Strait, Carrying Your Love With Me

Favorite Female – R&B
 Janet Jackson, The Velvet Rope
 Erykah Badu, Baduizm
 Mary J. Blige, Share My World

Favorite Group – R&B
 Boyz II Men, Evolution
 En Vogue, EV3
 God's Property, God's Property from Kirk Franklin's Nu Nation

Favorite Male – Rap
 Puff Daddy, No Way Out
 Master P, Ghetto D
 Notorious B.I.G., Life After Death

Favorite Group – Rap
 Bone Thugs-N-Harmony, The Art of War
 Lost Boyz, Love, Peace & Nappiness
 Wu-Tang Clan, Wu-Tang Forever

Favorite Group – Classic Rock
 Aerosmith, Nine Lives
 Fleetwood Mac, The Dance
 Rolling Stones, Bridges to Babylon

Favorite Group – Modern Rock
 Sugar Ray, Floored
 Live, Secret Samadhi
 Prodigy, The Fat of the Land

Favorite Soundtrack
 Men in Black
 Evita                                                
 The Preacher's Wife

Favorite Group – Pop
 Spice Girls, Spice/Spiceworld
 Hanson, Middle of Nowhere
 U2, Pop

Favorite Female – Pop
 Mariah Carey, Butterfly
 Celine Dion, Let's Talk About Love
 Sarah McLachlan, Surfacing

Favorite Group – New Artist
 Matchbox 20, Yourself or Someone Like You
 Hanson, Middle of Nowhere
 Spice Girls, Spice

Favorite Male – New Artist
 Puff Daddy, No Way Out
 Bob Carlisle, Butterfly Kisses
 Mase, Harlem World

Favorite Female – New Artist
 Meredith Brooks, Blurring the Edges
 Erykah Badu, Baduizm
 Missy "Misdemeanor" Elliott, Supa Dupa Fly

References

1998 awards in the United States
1998 film awards
1998 music awards
1998 in Los Angeles
Blockbuster LLC